The football rivalry between Olympiacos and PAOK is considered the fiercest intercity rivalry in Greece and a large number of games between the two football teams have been stigmatized by nasty incidents.

History

Cultural rivalry
Thessalonians feel that Athens in general and especially Piraeus has consistently been favored by the Greek State over their city and state and the fans of Thessalonian teams consider their Athenian and Piraeus rivals, the so-called Π.Ο.Κ., the main reason that their teams have been marginalized.

Statistics

Head-to-head

Records

Record Alpha Ethniki win
Olympiacos
Home: Olympiacos – PAOK 6–0, Karaiskakis Stadium, 3 June 1962(Psichos 40', 47', Sideris 76', 80', 81', 84' pen.)
Away: PAOK – Olympiacos 0–4, Toumba Stadium, 27 January 1965(Botinos 20', Gioutsos 47', Aganian 59', Sideris 74')
PAOK
Home: PAOK – Olympiacos 6–1, Serres Stadium, 6 December 1987(Bannon 5', Mavromatis 14', Siggas 18', Baniotis 41', Borbokis 75', 89' – Tsalouchidis 50')
Away: Olympiacos – PAOK 0–4, Karaiskakis Stadium, 4 January 1976(Terzanidis 24', Koudas 56', 62', Guerino 77')
Record Cup win
Olympiacos
Home: Olympiacos – PAOK 4–0, Karaiskakis Stadium, 28 May 1975(Persidis 16', Kritikopoulos 70', 90'+1', Losanta 73')
Neutral field: Olympiacos – PAOK 4–0, Apostolos Nikolaidis Stadium, 11 March 1951(Mouratis 27', Darivas 66', Drossos 75', 80')
Away: PAOK – Olympiacos 1–2, Toumba Stadium, 27 November 1996(Zouboulis 20' – Alexandris 52', Đorđević 75' pen.)
PAOK
Home: PAOK – Olympiacos 3–0, Toumba Stadium, 9 January 1991(Karageorgiou 6' pen., Borbokis 43', Hassan 52')
Neutral field: Olympiacos – PAOK 2–4, Nikos Goumas Stadium, 12 May 2001(Đorđević 78' pen., Choutos 90'+2' – Engomitis 4', Borbokis 31', Georgiadis 46', Nalitzis 85')
Away: Olympiacos – PAOK 1–2, Karaiskakis Stadium, 6 February 1980(Galakos 14' – Orfanos 12', Vassilakos 25')and Olympiacos – PAOK 1–2, Georgios Kamaras Stadium, 12 March 2003(Choutos 76' – Georgiadis 30', Okkas 32')
Longest sequence of Alpha Ethniki wins
Olympiacos: 7, 22 February 1998 – 14 October 2001
Home: 14, 12 November 1989 – 11 January 2004
Away: 3, 3 October 1998 – 14 October 2001
PAOK: 3, 4 January 1976 – 3 April 1977
Home: 11, 11 June 1972 – 23 January 1983
Away: 2, 24 January 2010 – 21 November 2010
Longest sequence of Cup wins
Olympiacos: 4, 27 May 1992 – 12 May 2001
Home: 5, 24 January 1990 – 12 March 2003
Away: 1
PAOK: 4, 12 May 2001 – 4 February 2009
Home: 4, 26 February 2003 – 2 March 2016
Away: 1
Longest sequence of unbeaten Alpha Ethniki matches
Olympiacos: 12, 22 February 1998 – 11 January 2004
Home: 14, 12 November 1989 – 11 January 2004
Away: 12, 31 October 1998 – 9 May 2010
PAOK: 4, 31 May 1981 – 12 June 1983
Home: 21, 3 January 1971 – 24 May 1992
Away: 3, 30 September 2018 – 27 January 2021
Longest sequence of unbeaten Cup matches
Olympiacos: 7, 11 March 1951 – 6 February 1980
Home: 6, 20 November 1985 – 12 March 2003
Away: 2, 20 May 1992 – 26 February 2003
PAOK: 4, 12 May 2001 – 4 March 2009
Home: 4, 26 February 2003 – 2 March 2016
Away: 4, 10 March 1976 – 24 January 1990
Attendance records
Olympiacos home:
74,232 Olympiacos – PAOK 0–1, Athens Olympic Stadium, 2 October 1988
PAOK home:
45,147 PAOK – Olympiacos 2–1, Toumba Stadium, 5 December 1976

Matches list

Panhellenic Championship (1927–28 - 1958–59)

Super League Greece (1959–60 – present)

1 Match suspended at 27th minute (score: 1–0). Olympiacos were awarded a 2–0 win.2 Match suspended at 83rd minute (score: 1–2). Remained as final result.3 Match suspended before the kick-off. Olympiacos were awarded a 0–3 win.

Greek Cup

1 Match suspended at 90th minute (score: 1–2). Olympiacos were awarded a 0–3 win.2 PAOK didn't show up in the match, so Olympiacos were awarded a 3–0 win and advanced to the Final.

• Series won: Olympiacos 15, PAOK 9.

References

Greece football derbies
Olympiacos F.C.
PAOK